Ignacio Mauricio Jesús Arce (born 8 April 1992) is an Argentine professional footballer who plays as a goalkeeper for Chilean club Unión La Calera.

Club career
Arce started in Primera B Nacional with Unión Santa Fe. His debut arrived on 24 September 2010 during a 0–2 loss to Patronato, in a season where he was an unused substitute twenty-three times. On 11 July 2012, Deportivo Merlo loaned Arce. He featured in four games in 2012–13. 2014 saw Arce join Atlético Paraná of Torneo Federal A. They were promoted in his opening year, in which he featured nineteen times. He remained for the 2015 Primera B Nacional campaign. For the next two seasons, Arce spent time with fellow second tier side Crucero del Norte. Forty-nine appearances followed.

He was loaned out for a fourth time on 31 July 2017, joining San Martín. His first appearance came on 16 September in Primera B Nacional versus Ferro Carril Oeste. 2017–18 ended with promotion to the Primera División. He participated in nine matches in the first half of 2018–19, though Arce returned to Unión Santa Fe in January 2019 and subsequently left on loan once more to Instituto. In July 2019, Arce again left Unión on loan as he agreed terms on a return to San Martín. He scored the first goal of his senior career on 24 November, netting a stoppage time equaliser against ex-club Instituto at home.

On 14 January 2022, Arce joined Chilean Primera División club Unión La Calera on a deal until the end of 2023.

International career
Arce was selected by the Argentina U17s for the 2009 FIFA U-17 World Cup in Nigeria. He appeared in one fixture, a final matchday group defeat to the hosts on 30 October. He also went to the 2009 South American Under-17 Football Championship but didn't play. In November 2010, he trained with the U20s ahead of the 2011 South American U-20 Championship in Peru though wasn't picked in the tournament squad.

Career statistics
.

References

External links

1992 births
Living people
Argentine footballers
Argentine expatriate footballers
Argentina youth international footballers
People from Paraná, Entre Ríos
Sportspeople from Entre Ríos Province
Association football goalkeepers
Primera Nacional players
Argentine Primera División players
Chilean Primera División players
Torneo Federal A players
Unión de Santa Fe footballers
Deportivo Merlo footballers
Club Atlético Paraná players
Crucero del Norte footballers
San Martín de Tucumán footballers
Instituto footballers
Unión La Calera footballers
Argentine expatriate sportspeople in Chile
Expatriate footballers in Chile